Grace Adhiambo Okulu (born 16 March 1998) is a Kenyan rugby sevens player. She competed in the 2020 Summer Olympics.

References

1998 births
Living people
People from Nakuru
Rugby sevens at the 2020 Summer Olympics
Kenyan rugby sevens players
Olympic rugby sevens players of Kenya
Rugby sevens players at the 2020 Summer Olympics
Kenya international women's rugby sevens players